Arnoldsville is a city in Oglethorpe County, Georgia, United States. As of the 2020 census, the city had a population of 431.

History
Arnoldsville was originally called "Cherokee Corner". The name was changed in 1894 to Edwin, after Edwin Shaw, the keeper of a country store. In 1896, the store was sold to N. D. Arnold, and the town's name was changed yet again. Arnold incorporated in 1969.

Geography
Arnoldsville is located at  (33.905440, -83.216737). U.S. Route 78 passes just south of the city, leading east  to Crawford and northwest  to Athens. 

Demographics

As of the census of 2000, there were 312 people, 125 households, and 88 families residing in the city. The racial makeup of the city was 96.47% White, 1.60% African American, 0.32% Asian, 0.96% from other races, and 0.64% from two or more races. Hispanic or Latino of any race were 1.92% of the population.

There were 125 households, out of which 33.6% had children under the age of 18 living with them, 56.8% were married couples living together, 11.2% had a female householder with no husband present, and 29.6% were non-families. 28.0% of all households were made up of individuals, and 10.4% had someone living alone who was 65 years of age or older.  The average household size was 2.50 and the average family size was 3.08.

In the city, the population was spread out, with 26.3% under the age of 18, 9.3% from 18 to 24, 27.9% from 25 to 44, 24.4% from 45 to 64, and 12.2% who were 65 years of age or older.  The median age was 37 years. For every 100 females, there were 95.0 males.  For every 100 females age 18 and over, there were 88.5 males.

The median income for a household in the city was $32,750, and the median income for a family was $42,083. Males had a median income of $32,917 versus $21,667 for females. The per capita income for the city was $17,652.  About 9.9% of families and 12.3% of the population were below the poverty line, including 18.9% of those under age 18 and 20.7% of those age 65 or over.

References

Cities in Georgia (U.S. state)
Cities in Oglethorpe County, Georgia
Athens – Clarke County metropolitan area